Vast Phiri (born 3 February 1996) is a Zambian international footballer who plays as a defender for the Zambia women's national football team. She competed for Zambia at the 2018 Africa Women Cup of Nations, playing in one match.

References

1997 births
Living people
Zambian women's footballers
Zambia women's international footballers
Women's association football defenders
ZESCO United F.C. players
Footballers at the 2020 Summer Olympics
Olympic footballers of Zambia